The Last Reality Show is a Swedish TV series that aired on TV 6 in Sweden the spring of 2012. The show portrays a zombie apocalypse as seen through the eyes of the cast and crew of a reality show. The title of the series refers to the name of said reality show being produced which is to bring forth the ultimate Swedish reality star (reality show stars of Swedish reality shows play themselves) as well that the fact that almost every episode features the death of one of the reality stars. The show featured 8 episodes. The series was created and produced by Tord Danielsson, directed by Oskar Mellander and photographed by Anders Jacobsson of Evil Ed fame.

Cast
Filip Berg as Abbe, trainee and protagonist of the show
Christian Wennberg, the show's deranged and amoral producer. The main antagonist of the show he finally dies in the last episode being killed by Stefan who has turned in to a zombie.
Cecilia Forss, showhost and Abbe's love interest
Simon Danielsson as himself, a winner of Swedish Big Brother who proves to be a heroic zombie killer. He apparently kills himself after taking a bite from the "Socialist zombie".
Vanita Bergman as herself, a dimwitted but kind reality star. She is killed when she and Daniel Paris are attacked by zombies in a trash compound.
Daniel Paris as himself, a scared and spoiled reality star. He is killed when he and Vanita are attacked by zombies in a trash compound.
Andreas La Chenardière as Peppe, a scientist trying to find a cure for the zombie plague. He is killed by Micke B.
Meral Tasbas as herself, a cocky reality veteran of 8 reality shows. She is killed by Robber 1 taking a shotgun blast to her face.
Kim Anderzon as Abbe's Grandmother, Abbe's wise grandmother. She is killed by a gunshot from Micke B
Gloria Tapia as Shirin, a kind and though nurse. She blows herself up to save the other's from a hoard of zombies.
Andreas Plogell as himself, a vain reality star. He dies when trying to remove his shirt while running causing him to fall and break his neck. He is the only character whose death is an accident.
Robban Andersson as himself, a veteran from Swedish Survivor. He is killed by Simon after turning into a zombie after having his finger bitten off by the "Naked zombie".
Jockiboi as himself, a sex-mad reality star. He is infected by the "Naked zombie" and is only seen once more being spotted as a zombie by Micke B.
Matti Boustedt as Banditleader, a vicious and threatening hunter and the leader of a band of robbers. He is killed by his former friend Tony the Zombie after being chained up close to him by Vanita.
Karl Andersson as Stefan, an editor
Lill-Babs as herself. She is gutted by the "Legless zombie" after trying to fight off a hoard of infected.
Patrik Sjöberg as himself
Erik Wilandh as Robber 1
Ale Ottenby as Robber 2
Magnus G. Bergström as Tony the zombie
Fredrik Blom as Forestzombie
Pernilla Thelenius as Bus-zombie
Hugo Andersson as Legless zombie
Frida K. Eriksson as Socialist zombie
Pekka Lampela as Naked zombie
Anna Tribbler as Hospital zombie
Rolf Nilsson as Churchzombie
Anders Muammar as Cow-eating zombie
Viking Almquist as a zombie in the series opening credits

References 

2012 Swedish television series debuts
Zombies in television
Reality television series parodies